Quam Lake is a lake in Douglas County, in the U.S. state of Minnesota.

Quam Lake was named for P. J. Quam.

See also
List of lakes in Minnesota

References

Lakes of Minnesota
Lakes of Douglas County, Minnesota